, also known as Menju Katsusuke, was a general and retainer of Shibata Katsuie. As one of the Three Famous Swordsmen of the Battle of Shizugatake, he fought with outstanding valor until he was killed in battle.

References 
https://web.archive.org/web/20120331175205/https://www.monika-schmidt.com/japan/japanbild/t16_e.htm

Samurai
People of Azuchi–Momoyama-period Japan
1583 deaths
Year of birth unknown